Hope is a 2007 German-Polish drama film directed by Stanisław Mucha. It was entered into the 29th Moscow International Film Festival.

Cast
 Rafał Fudalej as Franciszek Ratay
 Kamilla Baar as Klara
 Wojciech Pszoniak as Benedykt Weber
 Zbigniew Zapasiewicz as Franciszek's Father
 Zbigniew Zamachowski as Sopel
 Grzegorz Artman as Michal Ratay
 Jerzy Trela as Airclub Worker
 Jan Frycz as Gustaw
 Lilith Mucha as Melania
 Dominika Ostalowska as Matka

References

External links
 

2007 films
2007 drama films
Films scored by Max Richter
German drama films
Polish drama films
2000s Polish-language films
Films with screenplays by Krzysztof Kieślowski
Films with screenplays by Krzysztof Piesiewicz
2000s German films